Darrell Daniels (born November 22, 1994) is an American football tight end who is a free agent. He played college football at Washington and signed with the Indianapolis Colts as an undrafted free agent in 2017.

Early years
Daniels played high school football at Freedom High School in Oakley, California. He played wide receiver and linebacker his junior year in 2011 and was named the Bay Valley Athletic League (BVAL) MVP. He caught 30 passes for 426 yards and 7 touchdowns in 2011. Daniels recorded 54 receptions, 947 receiving yards, 20 receiving touchdowns, 40 rushing attempts, and 332 rushing yards his senior season in 2012. He also recorded 38 tackles and 2 interceptions as a defensive back in 2012. He earned CalHiSports.com Third-team All-State, MaxPreps Second-team Division I All-State and BVAL Co-MVP honors in 2012. Daniels played in the 2013 Semper Fidelis All-American Bowl.

College career
Daniels played for the Washington Huskies from 2013 to 2016. He played in 11 games in 2013, recording 2 solo tackles and 1 tackle assist. He converted from wide receiver to tight end midway through the year. Daniels played in 11 games, starting 4, in 2014, catching 11 passes for 171 yards and 1 touchdown. He also totaled four solo tackles. He played in 13 games, starting 8, in 2015, catching 19 passes for 250 yards and 1 touchdown. Daniels also recorded four solo tackles and two tackle assists. He played in 14 games, starting 6, in 2016, catching 17 passes for 307 yards and 4 touchdowns. He earned Honorable Mention All-Pac-12 honors in 2016. He played in 49 games, starting 18, during his college career, catching 47 passes for 728 yards and 5 touchdowns. Daniels also recorded 10 solo tackles and 3 tackle assists.

Professional career
Daniels was rated the 25th best tight end in the 2017 NFL Draft by NFLDraftScout.com. Lance Zierlein of NFL.com predicted that he would be drafted in the seventh round or be a priority free agent, stating that "Daniels' combination of athletic ability and physical traits figures to land him as a third-day draft pick, but he will have to learn to run routes more effectively as a matchup tight end in the NFL or he will find himself stuck on the practice squad for a couple of seasons."

Indianapolis Colts
Daniels signed with the Indianapolis Colts as an undrafted free agent on May 4, 2017. During the Week 3 31–28 victory against the Cleveland Browns, he recorded his first career NFL reception, which was a six-yarder.

Seattle Seahawks
On September 1, 2018, Daniels was traded to the Seattle Seahawks for wide receiver Marcus Johnson. He was waived by the Seahawks on September 25, 2018 and was re-signed to the practice squad. He was promoted to the active roster on October 3, 2018 following an injury to Will Dissly. He was waived on November 24, 2018.

Arizona Cardinals
On November 26, 2018, Daniels was claimed off waivers by the Arizona Cardinals.

On August 31, 2019, Daniels was waived by the Cardinals and was signed to the practice squad the next day. He was promoted to the active roster on September 7, 2019, only to be waived two days later and re-signed back to the practice squad. He was promoted back to the active roster on September 21, 2019. He was waived again on September 28, 2019 and re-signed to the practice squad. He was promoted again on October 5.
In Week 14 against the Pittsburgh Steelers, Daniels forced a fumble on punter Jordan Berry during a fake punt attempt which was recovered by teammate Dennis Gardeck in the 23–17 loss. He was placed on injured reserve on December 28, 2019.

In Week 9 of the 2020 season against the Miami Dolphins, Daniels recorded 1 catch for a 21 yard touchdown during the 34–31 loss.  This was Daniels’ first career touchdown in the NFL. He was placed on injured reserve on November 28, 2020. He was activated on December 19, 2020.

On March 25, 2021, Daniel re-signed with the Cardinals to a one-year contract.

Houston Texans
On May 23, 2022, Daniels signed with the Houston Texans. He was released on June 11.

Indianapolis Colts (second stint)
On November 9, 2022, Daniels signed with the practice squad of the Indianapolis Colts. He was released on November 15.

References

External links
Arizona Cardinals bio
College stats

1994 births
Living people
African-American players of American football
American football tight ends
American football wide receivers
Arizona Cardinals players
Houston Texans players
Indianapolis Colts players
People from Pittsburg, California
Players of American football from California
Seattle Seahawks players
Sportspeople from the San Francisco Bay Area
Washington Huskies football players
21st-century African-American sportspeople